Moussaka is an eggplant- or potato-based dish, often including ground meat, which is common in the Balkans and the Middle East, with many local and regional variations.

The best-known version in Europe and the Americas is the Greek variant created in the 1920s by Nikolaos Tselementes.  Many versions have a top layer made of milk-based sauce thickened with egg (custard) or flour (béchamel sauce). In Greece, the dish is layered and typically served hot. Tselementes also proposed a vegan variant for orthodox fast days. Romania also has a vegan version that replaces meat with mushrooms or a mix of sautéed onions and rice.

The versions in Egypt, Turkey and the rest of the Middle East are quite different. In Egypt, messa'aa can be made vegan  or vegetarian as well as with meat; in all cases, the main ingredient is the fried eggplant. In Turkey, mussaka consists of thinly sliced and fried eggplant served in a tomato-based meat sauce, warm or at room temperature. In Saudi Arabia  is eaten hot, but in other Arab countries, it is often eaten cold, but occasionally hot as well.

Names and etymology 
The English name for moussaka was borrowed from Greek  and from other Balkan languages, all borrowed from Ottoman Turkish, which in turn borrοwed it from Arabic  . The word is first attested in English in 1862, written mùzàkkà.

Preparation

Greece 

Most versions are based primarily on sautéed aubergine (eggplant) and tomato, usually with minced meat, mostly lamb. The Greek version includes layers of meat and eggplant topped with a béchamel ("white") sauce and baked.

The modern Greek version was created by the French-trained Greek chef Nikolaos Tselementes in the 1920s. His recipe has three layers that are separately cooked before being combined for the final baking: a bottom layer of sliced eggplant sautéed in olive oil; a middle layer of ground lamb lightly cooked with chopped or puréed tomatoes, onion, garlic, and spices (cinnamon, allspice and black pepper); and a top layer of béchamel sauce or savoury custard.

There are variations on this basic recipe, sometimes with no top sauce, sometimes with other vegetables.  Such variants may include, in addition to the eggplant slices, sautéed zucchini (courgette) slices, part-fried potato slices, or sautéed mushrooms. There is a fast-day (vegan) version in Tselementes' cookbook, which includes neither meat nor dairy products, just vegetables (ground eggplant is used instead of ground meat), tomato sauce, and bread crumbs.

Other countries of Southeast Europe 

In Albania, Bulgaria, the former Yugoslavia, and Romania, potatoes are used instead of eggplant, pork or beef mince, and the top layer is usually milk or yogurt mixed with raw eggs, sometimes with a small amount of flour added. There is also a three-layer version: the bottom layer consists of ground pork and beef, the middle layer of potato slices, and the top layer is typically a custard. Each layer is cooked on its own and layered in a pan and baked until the top is browned.

Typically, the Romanian version is made with potatoes or eggplant or cabbage. The layers start with the vegetable, then the layer of meat (usually pork), then vegetables, until the pot is full. Sometimes bread crumbs are used as a topping, sometimes slices of tomatoes and crushed cheese. The pot is then filled with tomato sauce. There is also a pasta variant, with pasta being used instead of vegetables. The "fasting" variant, which is vegan, replaces meat with mushrooms or a mix of sautéed onions and rice.

In the rest of the Balkans, the top layer is often a custard: this is the version introduced in the UK by Elizabeth David's Mediterranean Cookery and where it remains the usual presentation. Grated cheese or bread crumbs are often sprinkled on top.

Levant 
In the Levant, moussaka is a cooked dish made up primarily of tomatoes and eggplant, similar to Sicilian caponata, and may also include chickpeas. It may be served cold as a mezze dish, or hot.

Egypt 
The Egyptian version of moussaka is made from layers of fried eggplant immersed in tomato sauce and then baked. A layer of seasoned cooked ground beef is usually added between the eggplant before baking. The dish can be served hot but is usually chilled for a day or so to improve the taste.

Turkey 

Turkish  is not layered. Instead, thinly sliced eggplant is fried and served in tomato-based meat sauce seasoned with green peppers, garlic and onions. There are also variants with zucchini (courgettes), carrots and potatoes.

See also 
 List of casserole dishes
 Bobotie - recipe comparable to moussaka, popular in South Africa
 Empadão - recipe comparable to moussaka, popular in Portugal
 Karnıyarık – recipe comparable to moussaka, popular in Turkey
 Pastitsio – Greek baked pasta dish
 Parmigiana - sliced eggplant layered with cheese and tomato sauce and then baked, popular in Italy
 Shepherd's pie – recipe comparable to moussaka, popular in the United Kingdom
 Tepsi baytinijan – recipe comparable to moussaka, popular in Iraq

References

External links 
 

Arab cuisine
Balkan cuisine
Ottoman cuisine
Levantine cuisine
Egyptian cuisine
Casserole dishes
Eggplant dishes
Turkish cuisine
Ground meat